An incomplete list of the tallest structures in Algeria. 
l

External links 
 http://skyscraperpage.com/diagrams/?searchID=37711928

Tallest
Algeria
Algeria